Christmas is Coming is a 2017 Nigerian romantic comedy film starring Ufuoma McDermott, Chioma Chukwuka, Deyemi Okanlawon, Zack Orji and Sola Sobowale. The film was written and directed by Ufuoma McDermott.

Plot
Henri Atta (Ufuoma McDermott) is a tomboy who suffers a string of misadventures after undergoing a makeover by her flatmates; Avia and Nene (Mary Lazarus, Izzie Otaigbe) a few days to Christmas, which also coincides with her big pitch at the office.

Henri is given a hard time during her pitch, which is further exacerbated by the antics of her colleague Lola Makinde (Chioma Chukwuka).

The story takes a turn, when Henri unwittingly falls in love with her boss Koko Williams (Deyemi Okanlawon).

Cast

Ufuoma McDermott as Henri Atta
Sola Sobowale as Mrs. Atta
Chioma Akpotha as Lola Makinde
Zack Orji as General Atta
Deyemi Okanlanwon as Koko Williams
Mary Lazarus as Avia
Gregory Ojefua as Mr. Esan
Michael Okon as Harry
Izzie Otaigbe as Izzie Otaigbe
Odenike Odetola as Sales Clerk
Amanda Oruh as Chika Eze
Ray Adeka as Osaretin Ida

Production and release

Ufuoma McDermott revealed that she began writing the story for the film in 2013, while principal photography began in early 2017 and the trailer was released on 24 October 2017. The film premiered at the Filmhouse IMAX Cinemas, Lekki on 18 November 2017, and pre-release tickets were sold, before the film was released in cinemas across Nigeria on 24 November 2017.

Critical reception
Pulse Nigeria reported that actor Richard Mofe-Damijo remarked upon seeing the film “I love it! I love the movie.” The general consensus on the site was that Christmas is Coming will “get you reeling with laughter but also get you mildly tensed because of the suspense all packed up in the final scenes.”

See also
 List of Nigerian films of 2017

References 

English-language Nigerian films
Nigerian romantic comedy films
2010s English-language films
2010 romantic comedy films